The  Washington Redskins season was the franchise's 31st season in the National Football League (NFL) and their 26th in Washington, D.C. The team tried to improve on their 1–12–1 record from 1961 and did by making it 5-7-2.

Offseason

NFL Draft

Ernie Davis was the first black player to be chosen first overall in the NFL Draft.

Regular season

Schedule
Ref:

Standings

Roster

References

Washington
Washington Redskins seasons
Washing